Ernest de Koven Leffingwell (January 13, 1875January 27, 1971) was an arctic explorer, geologist and Spanish–American War veteran.

During the period from 1906 to 1914, Leffingwell spent nine summers and six winters on the Arctic coast of Alaska, making 31 trips by dog sled or small boats. He created the first accurate map of a large part of the Alaskan arctic coastline.  He was the first to scientifically describe permafrost and to pose theories about permafrost which have largely proven true.  He accurately identified the oil potential of the North Slope region of Alaska.

Biography

Ernest de Koven Leffingwell was born January 13, 1875, in Knoxville, Illinois, to Charles and Elizabeth (née Francis) Leffingwell. He attended the grammar school at Racine College, then attended Trinity College, Hartford, Connecticut, where he was captain of the track team his senior year, graduated with the AB degree in 1895 and was awarded a MA in 1900.  He studied physics and geology at the University of Chicago 1896 to 1898 and 1900 to 1906.  He played on the Chicago Maroons football team. Leffingwell had passed his preliminary examination and was a doctoral candidate when he left for Alaska in 1906 but apparently did not complete the degree. He taught science at St Alban's school in Knoxville, Illinois, in 1895–96 and 1903–04, in the latter period also serving as Superintendent. During the Spanish–American War he served as a Seaman on the US battleship Oregon during its celebrated dash around Cape Horn and in the Battle of Santiago.

He led the science staff in the 1901 Baldwin-Ziegler North Pole Expedition, which failed in its attempt to reach the North Pole from Franz Josef Land. On this expedition, he became friends with Danish explorer Ejnar Mikkelsen. Subsequently, the two raised funds for their own expedition. Leffingwell's father, who had become wealthy from his ownership of a fruit ranch in California, contributed $5000, and Mikkelsen raised a comparable amount in England and New York. Their venture became the Anglo-American Polar Expedition of 1906–1908 which aimed to explore the Beaufort Sea. At that time, many experts believed than an undiscovered land mass lay in this region, since such a mass could account for observed patterns of arctic currents and tides. The underfunded expedition fared badly but achieved some positive results. No new land was discovered, but they delineated part of the continental shelf and Leffingwell began his mapping efforts.  Their ship, the Duchess of Bedford, was locked in pack ice and destroyed, but they salvaged the wood to build a cabin which Leffingwell used intermittently through 1914. Mikkelsen returned to the US in 1907, but Leffingwell remained on the arctic coast for another year. He returned to the North Slope 1909–1912 and 1913–1914, working with one assistant to map 250 km of the arctic coast, and the Canning River valley .

After spending a year and a half writing up his results at the United States Geological Survey in Washington, Leffingwell retired to Whittier, California, listing his occupation in 1917 as citriculturist. He moved to Carmel, California, about 20 years later. When he died in 1971, fourteen days after his 96th birthday, he was believed to have been the oldest surviving polar explorer.

Leffingwell camp site
The Leffingwell Camp Site located on a remote barrier island off Alaska, was declared a National Historic Landmark in 1978.

Honors
Leffingwell was awarded the Patron's Medal by the Royal Geographical Society and the Charles P. Daly Medal by the American Geographical Society, both in 1922.  He was awarded an honorary Doctor of Science degree by Trinity College in 1923. Leffingwell Fork, a stream on Alaska's North Slope, Leffingwell Ridge (Brooks Range) in the Arctic National Wildlife Refuge, Leffingwell Glacier in the Romanzof Mountains of the Brooks Range, Leffingwell Crags in Canada's Northwest Territories, and Leffingwell Nunatak in Greenland are named for him.

Publications
 SR Capps and EDK Leffingwell (1904) "Pleistocene Geology of the Sawatch Range near Leadville Colo" The Journal of Geology 12, Nov–Dec pp 698–706.
 Ernest de Koven Leffingwell (1908) "Flaxman Island a glacial remnant" Journal of Geology 16 (1) pp. 56–63
 Ernest de Koven Leffingwell (1915a) "A communication from Leffingwell" University of Chicago Magazine 7 (3) January 1915, pp 76–79. Leffingwell's short popular account, written for the alumni magazine. See also page 69.
 Ernest de K. Leffingwell (1915b) "Ground-ice wedges, the dominant form of ground-ice on the north coast of Alaska" Journal of Geology 23, pp 635–654.
 Ernest de K. Leffingwell (1919) The Canning River Region, Northern Alaska Professional paper 109, United States Geological Survey, Govt. print. off., Washington (also at Hathi Trust )
 Ernest de Koven Leffingwell (1961) "My Polar Explorations, 1901–1914", Explorers Journal 39, 2–14

Notes

References

Further reading
 Ejnar Mikkelsen (1907) Report of the Mikkelsen-Leffingwell Expedition Bulletin of the American Geographical Society 39, pp 606–620 Oct 1907.
 Ejnar Mikkelsen (1909) Conquering the Arctic Ice W. Heinemann, London (bears US copyright notice)
 Vilhjalmr Stefansson "The Anglo American Polar Expedition" Harper's monthly magazine v 116 February 1908 pp 327–343
 1912 account in the Trinity alumni magazine

External links
 "Retracing Leffingwell: A 5-Month Journey in the Alaskan Arctic by Dog Sled", by Joe Henderson
 "Ernest Leffingwell: Scientist with a fan club" Alaska Science Forum, Article #1945, February 4, 2009, by Ned Rozell.
 Andrew Burke Ernest de Koven Leffingwell in the Arctic andrewburke.ca, posted 2010-11-12. Burke is Leffingwell's great-grandson; this blog post has, among other things, some family information about Leffingwell's Navy service and his life in California, including a picture of him working on a hot rod at age 83.
 Ernest de Koven Leffingwell papers at Dartmouth College finding aid
 Ernest de Koven Leffingwell papers at the US Army Heritage and Education Center, Carlisle, PA; catalog entry (particularly naval service). Link ip-184-168-105-185.ip.secureserver.net/archivegrid/record.php?id=793425002 not presently clickable, copy to address bar.
 Ernest de Koven Leffingwell photographs at USGS https://library.usgs.gov/photo/#/ search Leffingwell
 The Papers of Ernest de Koven Leffingwell at Dartmouth College Library

1875 births
1971 deaths
American geographers
American geologists
American military personnel of the Spanish–American War
Chicago Maroons football players
Explorers of the Arctic
People of the Alaska Territory
People from Knoxville, Illinois
People from North Slope Borough, Alaska
People from Whittier, California
Racine College alumni
Trinity College (Connecticut) alumni
Writers from Illinois
People from Carmel-by-the-Sea, California